The 2011 Lenox Industrial Tools 301 was a NASCAR Sprint Cup Series motor race held on July 17, 2011 at New Hampshire Motor Speedway in Loudon, New Hampshire. Contested over 301 laps on the 1.058-mile (1.703 km) asphalt oval, it was the 19th race of the 2011 Sprint Cup Series season. The race was won by Ryan Newman of Stewart Haas Racing, his first win of 2011. Newman's teammate and owner, Tony Stewart finished second and Denny Hamlin clinched third.

There were 10 cautions and 21 lead changes among 14 different drivers throughout the race. Following the race, Carl Edwards led the Drivers' Championship with 652 points, seven ahead of Jimmie Johnson and eleven points ahead of Kurt Busch. Chevrolet led the Manufacturer Championship with 127 points, 17 ahead of Ford and 22 ahead of Toyota. A total of 95,000 people attended the race, while 4.6 million watched it on television.

Report

Background

New Hampshire Motor Speedway is one of ten intermediate tracks to hold NASCAR races; the others are Atlanta Motor Speedway, Charlotte Motor Speedway, Chicagoland Speedway, and Darlington Raceway as well as Homestead Miami Speedway, Kansas Speedway, Kentucky Speedway, Las Vegas Motor Speedway, and Texas Motor Speedway. The track's turns are banked at two to seven degrees, while the front stretch, the finish line, and the back stretch are banked at one degree.

Before the race, Kyle Busch led the Drivers' Championship with 624 points, and Carl Edwards stood in second with 620. Kevin Harvick was third in the Drivers' Championship with 614 points, eight ahead of Kurt Busch and nine ahead of Jimmie Johnson in fourth and fifth. Matt Kenseth with 602 was 49 ahead of Dale Earnhardt Jr., as Ryan Newman with 538 points, was nine ahead of Denny Hamlin, and eleven in front of Tony Stewart. In the Manufacturers' Championship, Chevrolet was leading with 118 points, 12 ahead of Ford. Toyota, with 99 points, was 27 points ahead of Dodge in the battle for third.

Practice and qualifying

Three practice sessions are scheduled before the race; the first on Friday, which lasted 90 minutes. The second and third were both on Saturday afternoon, lasting 60 minutes each. Clint Bowyer was quickest with a time of 28.379 seconds in the first session, around two hundredths seconds faster than Stewart. Newman was just off Stewart's pace, followed by A. J. Allmendinger, Paul Menard, and Kurt Busch. Regan Smith was seventh, still within a second of Bowyer's time.

Forty-six cars were entered for qualifying, but only forty-three could qualify for the race because of NASCAR's qualifying procedure. Newman clinched the 47th pole position of his career, with a record time of 28.165 seconds. He was joined on the front row of the grid by Stewart. David Reutimann qualified third, Kurt Busch took fourth, and Brad Keselowski started fifth. Jeff Burton, Gordon, Juan Pablo Montoya, Menard and Kasey Kahne rounded out the top ten. The three drivers that failed to qualify for the race were Tony Raines, Scott Riggs, and Dennis Setzer. Once the qualifying session completed, Newman commented, "This has been a track that's been really good for me for firsts and I'm looking for that first win again. It's extremely important here to start up front, it's a big track-position race, it's a relatively short race if you look at the mileage and the way the fuel stops work out. We've got a good start, we just need to have a good finish for the team. I want to get that victory on Sunday, that’s what I’m thinking about."

In the second practice session, Stewart was fastest with a time of 29.487 seconds, less than five-thousandths of a second quicker than second-placed Bowyer. Keselowski took third place, ahead of Gordon, Martin Truex Jr. and Hamlin. Burton was only quick enough for the seventh position. In the third and final practice, Johnson was quickest with a time of 29.391 seconds. Montoya followed in second, ahead of Newman and Burton. Keselowski was fifth quickest, with a time of 29.490 seconds. Joey Logano, Brian Vickers, Truex, Hamlin, and Kurt Busch rounded out the first ten positions.

Race

The race, the 19th in the season, began at 1:00 p.m. EDT and was televised live in the United States on TNT.

Results

Qualifying

Race results

Standings after the race

Drivers' Championship standings

Manufacturers' Championship standings

Note: Only the top five positions are included for the driver standings.

References

Lenox Industrial Tools 301
Lenox Industrial Tools 301
NASCAR races at New Hampshire Motor Speedway
Lenox Industrial Tools 301